Nebojša Gavrić (born 27 August 1991) is a Serbian professional footballer who plays as a midfielder for Bosnian Premier League club Tuzla City.

Trivia
Gavrić is one of the most tattooed Serbian footballers, having many tattoos on his whole body. He says that every tattoo has an explanation and a specific meaning.

Career statistics

Club

Honours
Mladost Lučani
Serbian First League: 2013–14

Sarajevo
Bosnian Premier League: 2019–20

See also
List of FK Sarajevo players

References

External links
Nebojša Gavrić stats at utakmica.rs

1991 births
Living people
Sportspeople from Zrenjanin
Serbian footballers
Serbian expatriate footballers
Expatriate footballers in Bosnia and Herzegovina
Serbian First League players
First League of the Republika Srpska players
Serbian SuperLiga players
Premier League of Bosnia and Herzegovina players
FK Borac Čačak players
FK Rudar Ugljevik players
FK Mladost Lučani players
FK Voždovac players
OFK Bačka players
FK Sarajevo players
FK Olimpik players
FK Tuzla City players
Association football midfielders